Charles Kaufman may refer to:
Charlie Kaufman (born 1958), American screenwriter, producer, and director
Charles Kaufman (screenwriter) (1904–1991), American screenwriter
Charles Kaufman (judge) (1920–2004), Michigan circuit court judge 
Charles Kaufman (educator) (1928–2016), American music educator